Showdown in Manila is a 2016 Russian-American action film directed by Mark Dacascos. The film was released on February 18, 2016, in Russian (with English scenes captioned) and on January 19, 2018, in English (with Russian scenes dubbed) worldwide.

Plot 
Nickolay "Nick" Peyton, a police officer of Russian origin, lives in Manila. Once on the police operation Nick is badly wounded and retires from police. Today he works as a private detective with his partner Charlie.
One day a woman comes to hire them for investigation of a strange murder of her husband. Searching for murderers leads Nick and Charlie to a base of criminals in the jungle. The gangsters' leader Aldric Cole was wounded by Nick in then police operation. So, Nick and Charlie gather a groupe of former elite soldiers to destroy the base of bandits.

Cast 
 Alexander Nevsky as Moscow Police Force SWAT Sgt. Nickolay 'Nick' Peyton
 Casper Van Dien as LAPD S.W.A.T. Officer Iv Charlie Benz
 Cary-Hiroyuki Tagawa as Aldric Cole 
 Tia Carrere as Mrs. Wells
 Mark Dacascos as Matthew Wells (cameo appearance) 
 Matthias Hues as Dorn
 Hafedh Dakhlaoui as 'Ghost'
 Don "The Dragon" Wilson as Delta Force MSG. Michael Dillon
 Cynthia Rothrock as Delta Force Lt. Haines
 Olivier Gruner as Delta Force SFC. Ford
 Dmitri Dyuzhev as Delta Force Sgt. Victor Selensky
 Robert Madrid as Carlos
 Iza Calzado as Sabio
 Maria Bravikova as Sofia
 Jake Macapagal as Kalalo
 Hazel Faith Dela Cruz as Kiki
 Moises Magisa as Mr. Camato
 Mon Confiado as Datu
 Patrick Carlos as MPD S.W.A.T. Ofc.Reyes
 Don Gordon Bell as Minter
 Polina Butorina as Larissa
 Trixie Dauz as Miss Divina
 Natalie Gubina as Alyson
 Michael Dyakonov as Anton
 Rich Valencia as Dorn's Girl / Dancer
 Krista Miller as Vivian (uncredited)

Production 
The film was shot in Manila (Philippines).

References

External links 
 Official site
  
 
 
  
 Review of film 

2016 films
2016 action films
Films set in Manila
Films shot in Manila
American action thriller films
American multilingual films
American films about revenge
Philippine films about revenge
CineTel Films films
Philippine multilingual films
2016 multilingual films
2010s English-language films
2010s American films